Dorothy Percy may refer to: 

Dorothy Percy, Countess of Northumberland (née Dorothy Devereux)
Dorothy Sidney, Countess of Leicester, née Dorothy Percy, her daughter